Arish Ahmad Khan (born January 24, 1977), better known by his stage name King Khan, is a Canadian musician/producer/artist/writer. He is best known as the frontman of King Khan and the Shrines and for being one half of The King Khan & BBQ Show.

Career
Khan was born in Montreal to an Indo-Canadian family. Since 2005, he resides in Berlin, Germany with his wife and two daughters, including the musician Saba Lou.

King Khan was a member of a number of Canadian garage bands including the Spaceshits, a frantic garage punk outfit formed in mid-1995. As his circle of fellow troublemaker musicians grew, in 1999, he helped create a "death cult" of such musicians, originally known as the "Kukamongas" with identifying tattoos and a love for real rock n' roll. He used the Blacksnake moniker while in the Spaceshits whose two full-length albums were released on Sympathy for the Record Industry.  He has spent a considerable amount of time in collaboration with former Spaceshits bandmate Mark Sultan in the two-man band, The King Khan & BBQ Show. Since 1999, King Khan has performed as leader and front man of King Khan and the Shrines, a psychedelic soul nine member band. They signed to Vice Records in 2008 and Merge Records in 2013. In early 2009, King Khan collaborated with Mark Sultan and the four members of the Black Lips to form a gospel supergroup called Almighty Defenders. Their debut album was released on Vice Records on September 22, 2009.

Film soundtracks
In 2005, Khan made his first film soundtrack for Schwarze Schafe (directed by Oliver Rihs). In 2016, he scored the film Back To Nothing (directed by Miron Zownir). In 2018, Khan was asked by Rapid Eye Movies to replace two soul songs in the film Blue Film Woman (directed by Kan Mukai) a soft core Japanese "Pink Film" made in 1969, restored and to be re-released in 2019 by Rapid Eye Movies. In 2019, he scored and was music supervisor for a documentary film about civil rights called The Invaders (directed by Prichard T. Smith).

Black Power tarot
In 2014, King Khan had the vision to celebrate Black Power using the mystic language of tarot. He chose 26 African American people who he felt followed a true path of illumination despite being born in a country that was so corrupt with racism and vehemently against them. Khan had studied the tarot over a decade and was given a deck of the Tarot de Marseilles by Alejandro Jodorowsky while he visited him at his home. Jodorowsky's personal teachings paved the way for Khan to understand the tarot much deeper than ever before. The mission behind the "Black Power Tarot" was to add a heavy dose of surrealistic mythos to American history by replacing the archetypes of the Major Arcana with the chosen people thus giving the world a new deck. Khan shared this vision with Belfast artist Michael Eaton who then came up with the drawings. Khan provided him with many specific design instructions to stay true to the sacred geometry of the Marseilles deck, so that this deck could be used in the same way. Khan then presented the drawings to Jodorowsky, who was asked to approve of each one. Jodorowsky approved 17 of the 22 cards in the first round. Khan & Eaton made the proper changes to the 5 remaining cards until they finally received Jodo's blessings and the supreme honour of being two of his spiritual warriors.

Khannibalism 
In August 2015, Khan announced the creation of his own record label Khannibalism, a joint venture between himself and Ernest Jenning Record Co. The label has released a series of four singles from the soundtrack to the film The Invaders, as well as full-length albums from William S. Burroughs, Khan, The Black Lips (with the Khan Family) and Saba Lou.
In 2019, Khannibalism plans on releasing the King Khan Experience, The Complete Invaders Film Soundtrack, Saba Lou's second album.

Louder Than Death
In 2018, King Khan started a new punk rock collective called "Louder Than Death". The first release on In The Red Records featured long time collaborators Sean and Erin Spits (from The Spits), Drew Owen (Sick Thoughts) and Saba Lou. King Khan then recruited the Magnetix and Fredovitch from Bordeaux to back him up and they recorded the "Stop Und Fick Dich" LP will be released in 2019 by In The Red Records.

The Spaceshits
The Spaceshits were established in mid-1995, featuring lead vocalist Mark Sultan, who was previously the drummer in a band called Powersquat in the Montreal suburb of Chateauguay. Khan had been since the end of 1994 in a Black Flag and Pavement-influenced band known as the Maury Povitch 3, a band that existed until its demise some time in 1996. In August 1995, following several lineup changes, he also became the Spaceshits' bassist and for several months would play shows for both bands. The Spaceshits inherited Powersquat's reputation for violent stage shows. At first, sets lasted no longer than 10 to 15 minutes, during which the band or members of the audience would create disturbances, at times including fireworks or food fights. Eventually the band's raucous live shows would lead them to be effectively blacklisted from many venues in Montreal, particularly after an April 8, 1996 set in support of the New Bomb Turks. Another notable incident occurred on April 30, 1999, just before the beginning of a European tour, while the band was promoting a new Sultan Records release. As the first act, the Scat Rag Boosters, was performing, the venue's owners got into an altercation with Khan, injuring his hand and leading to the destruction of a television.  This incident caused the two remaining bands, Lyle Sheraton and the Daylight Lovers, as well as the Spaceshits, to refuse to play, and they encouraged the audience to seek refunds. This event marked the end of the band's booking in Montreal.

The Spaceshits went on to complete a European tour; one which would prove to be the last for the band. After the European tour had ended, Blacksnake opted to stay behind. Rather than continue on without him, the band members broke up, believing both that the band had run its course, and that Blacksnake had been like a brother to them and so replacing him would have been impossible.

During his Spaceshits years, Khan became closely involved with a host of bands in the Montreal scene. These included The Irritations, The Infernos, Lyle Sheraton and the Daylight Lovers, the latter two that included Paul Spence, as well as The Scat Rag Boosters. He starred in short movies such as Enchiladas de Amore and the unfinished Count Crackula and the Cocaine Kid, where he was featured with Spence. He also wrote for the weekly Montreal Mirror mainly as a music critic, interviewing musicians and performing such stunts as travelling around Montreal nightspots disguised as a chicken. He also wrote articles for Vice magazine.

The King Khan & BBQ Show
Mark Sultan had been with Khan in the Spaceshits from 1995 to 1999. Following the Spaceshits' demise, Sultan started another Montreal-based band, Les Sexareenos, before venturing off on his own in 2002 as the one-man band BBQ. Visiting Khan at his home in Kassel, Germany, they quickly developed a new act featuring Khan and Sultan as his one-man band BBQ playing together. First, it was known as BBQ and Blacksnake, then as The King Khan and BBQ Show. The King Khan and BBQ Show broke up in June 2010, but in 2011 reunited and since 2012 have been sporadically touring.

King Khan and the Shrines
King Khan and the Shrines was established in the latter part of 1999 as Sultan helped start Les Sexareenos. The original lineup of the (Sensational) Shrines consisted of King Khan on vocals and guitars, Mr. Speedfinger on guitar, Boom Boom Jennes on bass, John Boy Adonis on "big beat," Sam Cook on trumpet, percussionist Ron Streeter (who formerly played for Curtis Mayfield, Stevie Wonder, and Al Jarreau), Ben Ra on saxophone, and Mr. Tom Bone on trombone. Eccentric French organist Fredovitch joined the lineup a week before the group recorded their first album at Toe Rag Studios in London.

Almighty Defenders
On the Black Lips' 2009 tour of India, following an incident at a rowdy show in which Cole Alexander kissed fellow bandmember Ian St. Pe and exposed his private parts on-stage, the Lips fled the country while rumors of their arrests circulated the internet. The tour was canceled and the group members fled to the Berlin, Germany residence of King Khan. Over the course of eight days, in a typically booze-sloppy Black Lips fashion, they laid down 11 tracks with Khan and his King Khan & BBQ Show bandmate Mark Sultan. On June 17, the full group made its live debut, performing a set in choir robes at the North by Northeast festival, and Vice Records made plans to release the Almighty Defenders' self-titled debut on September 22, 2009.

Live Performances with GZA
In 2009, King Khan collaborated with rapper GZA, also known as The Genius. GZA is a member of the Wu-Tang Clan known for his laid-back flow and poetic, insightful lyrics. The two musicians had recently performed together at the 2009 NXNE festival in Toronto and also at the Fun Fun Fun Fest in Austin, Texas. GZA gave Khan his Wu-name, "Lord Khan".

Other projects
King Khan has, in his Moon Studios and elsewhere, collaborated and recorded with friends and people he respects; as he told an interviewer, he records only people he loves. He has collaborated with Bloodshot Bill, releasing in 2009 a record under the name the Tandoori Knights. In 2001, Khan and Jasper Hood of the Moorat Fingers became The Black Jaspers, under which they recorded an album released in 2009 on In The Red Records. In March 2010, SubPop Records released "The Fiery Tears of St. Laurent" from King Khan and Pat Meteor. Meteor is best known for his work with The Demon's Claws, a Montreal-based band with which Khan has worked, and part of Khan's "death cult". In October 2010, a Tandoori Knights LP "Curry Up" was released followed by an EP called "Amon Ra Bless America" from a new project called Vomit Squad reuniting him with Spaceshits' drummer "Skid" Marks and others from the Montreal scene from which he came.  In June 2011, he announced a new country music-inspired project with Jeff Clarke of Demon's Claws called Khanwood Clarke. In November 2011, during the first Tandoori Knights' North American tour, he announced that new releases were soon to come from both Tandoori Knights and the Black Jaspers. In June 2013, the album he produced for outsider torch singer Mary Ocher was released on Hamburg's Buback records.

Controversy
Khan gained considerable media coverage after pictures surfaced on TMZ.com and Vice Magazine of him putting his bare buttocks in the face of actress Lindsay Lohan after performing as part of the Almighty Defenders at the Cannes Festival.

References

1977 births
Living people
Garage punk musicians
Canadian punk rock singers
Canadian musicians of Indian descent
Canadian people of Indian descent
Canadian punk rock guitarists
Singers from Montreal
21st-century Canadian male singers
21st-century Canadian guitarists